Lentibacillus panjinensis is a Gram-positive, aerobic, short rod-shaped and motile bacterium from the genus of Lentibacillus which has been isolated from Shrimp paste from Panjin.

References

Bacillaceae
Bacteria described in 2020